Nail fetish may refer to:

 Nkondi, wooden religious idols made by the Kongo people of the Congo region, which have nails hammered into them
 Hand fetishism, a sexual fascination with hands
 Foot fetishism, a sexual fascination with feet